A supercharger is an air compressor that increases the pressure or density of air supplied to an internal combustion engine.

Other uses of supercharge, supercharger or supercharged include:

Arts and entertainment
 Supercharger (album), by Machine Head, 2001
 Starpath Supercharger, add-on unit for the Atari 2600 video game console
 Skylanders: SuperChargers, a video game
 Supercharge (band), a 1970s British rock band
 Supercharge (song), by Enter Shikari 2017
 Supercharged (album), by Tavares, 1980
 Fast & Furious: Supercharged, a former amusement park attraction at Universal Studios Hollywood

Sports
 Big Chill Super Chargers, Philippine basketball team
 San Diego Super Chargers, fight song of an American football team

Science and technology
 Supercharge, a transformation in theoretical physics
 Tesla Supercharger, a 480-volt DC fast-charging station for electric cars
 Super-Charged network, or Super-Charger network, a telecommunications term

See also